The Pondicherry class are a class of minesweepers built for the Indian Navy by the Soviet Union. The vessels were acquired in two batches. The first were purchased from 1977 to 1980 and the second from 1986 to 1988. Technically, the second batch is referred to as the Karwar class but are physically identical to the first batch with the exception of additional surface-to-air missiles. As minesweepers, they are large and heavily armed. They can serve a dual purpose as an anti-submarine warfare escort. Their hulls are constructed of U3 low magnetic signature steel.

M61–M66 were based at Mumbai formed the 19 Mine Countermeasures Squadron (MCMS) and were decommissioned by the March 2015. M67–M72 are based at Visakhapatnam and form the 21 Mine Countermeasures Squadron (MCMS).

INS Konkan suffered minor fire accident in Vizag dry dock on 4 December 2013. She was operational by January 2014. INS Kozhikode  was the last ship in the series to be decommissioned on 13 April 2019.

Ships

See also
List of Indian Navy ships

References 

https://www.indiannavy.nic.in/content/decommissioning-indian-naval-ships-konkan-cannanore-and-cuddalore

External links

 Pondicherry Class - Bharat Rakshak
 http://www.globalsecurity.org/military/world/india/m-pondicherry.htm
 http://www.hazegray.org/worldnav/asiapac/india.htm#6
  All Pondicherry Class Minesweepers - Complete Ship List

Mine warfare vessel classes
 
 
India–Soviet Union relations